Wojciech Pollok (born 25 June 1982) is a Polish-German former professional footballer who played as a forward.

External links

Living people
1982 births
Association football forwards
German footballers
Polish emigrants to Germany
SG Wattenscheid 09 players
Borussia Dortmund II players
Kickers Emden players
Bonner SC players
SC Preußen Münster players
SV Eintracht Trier 05 players
Sportfreunde Siegen players
SC Wiedenbrück 2000 players
SV Wilhelmshaven players
3. Liga players

SV Lippstadt 08 players